The Askaryan radiation  also known as Askaryan effect is the phenomenon whereby a particle traveling faster than the phase velocity of light in a dense dielectric (such as salt, ice or the lunar regolith) produces a shower of secondary charged particles which contains a charge anisotropy and thus emits a cone of coherent radiation in the radio or microwave part of the electromagnetic spectrum. It is similar to the Cherenkov radiation. It is named after Gurgen Askaryan, a Soviet-Armenian physicist who postulated it in 1962.

The radiation was first observed experimentally in 2000, 38 years after its theoretical prediction. So far the effect has been observed in silica sand, rock salt, ice, and Earth's atmosphere.

The effect is of primary interest in using bulk matter to detect ultra-high energy neutrinos. The Antarctic Impulse Transient Antenna (ANITA) experiment uses antennas attached to a balloon flying over Antarctica to detect the Askaryan radiation produced as cosmic neutrinos travel through the ice. Several experiments have also used the Moon as a neutrino detector based on detection of the Askaryan radiation.

See also
Cherenkov radiation

References

External links
 RADHEP-2000 Write-ups

Physical phenomena
Particle physics